Michigan's 7th Senate district is one of 38 districts in the Michigan Senate. It has been represented by Democrat Jeremy Moss since 2023, succeeding fellow Democrat Dayna Polehanki.

Geography
District 7 encompasses parts of Oakland and Wayne counties.

2011 Apportionment Plan
District 7, as dictated by the 2011 Apportionment Plan, covered the immediate western suburbs of Detroit in Wayne County, including Livonia, Northville, the city and township of Plymouth, Canton, and Wayne.

The district was largely located within Michigan's 11th congressional district, also extending into the 13th district. It overlapped with the 11th, 16th, 19th, 20th, and 21st districts of the Michigan House of Representatives.

Recent election results

2018

2014

Federal and statewide results in District 7

Historical district boundaries

References 

7
Wayne County, Michigan